The 2009 Formula Le Mans Cup season was the only season of the Formula Le Mans Cup, a support series for the Le Mans Series and the 24 Hours of Le Mans.  All competitors utilized the Oreca FLM09 spec prototype.  The season featured ten races held over six events from 10 May to 20 September 2009. Nico Verdonck claimed the title ahead of Gavin Cronje, despite the drivers sharing a car all season. Verdonck benefitted from points awarded for pole positions and fastest laps, giving him a four-point advantage of Cronje. Their team, DAMS, also won the teams championship.

Race calendar and results
The Formula Le Mans Cup schedule consisted of several types of events.  Four events, held in support for the Le Mans Series, featured two races of 60 minutes each.  A fifth event at the 24 Hours of Le Mans utilized only a single 60 minute race.  The final event of the season at Magny-Cours featured three 60 minute races in succession with a winner determined only at the end of the third race.

Championship standings
Points are awarded to the top ten finishers in the order 20-15-12-10-8-6-4-3-2-1.

Drivers' standings
An additional bonus point was available for individual drivers at each race; these could be earned by winning pole position or by setting the fastest lap of the race.  A championship was also awarded to the best amateur driver over the season.

Teams' standings

References

External links
 Official website

European Le Mans Series
Formula Le Mans
Formula Le Mans Cup Season, 2009
2009 in European sport